Zacorisca is a genus of moths belonging to the subfamily Tortricinae of the family Tortricidae.

Species

Zacorisca aglaocarpa Meyrick, 1924
Zacorisca angi Diakonoff, 1952
Zacorisca aptycha Diakonoff, 1952
Zacorisca aquamarina Diakonoff, 1952
Zacorisca basilica Diakonoff, 1952
Zacorisca bovisanguis Diakonoff, 1952
Zacorisca chrysomelopa Meyrick, 1927
Zacorisca cyprantha Meyrick, 1924
Zacorisca daphnaea (Meyrick, 1924)
Zacorisca delphica (Meyrick, 1910)
Zacorisca digna Razowski, 2013
Zacorisca electrina (Meyrick, 1912)
Zacorisca enaemargyrea (Diakonoff, 1952)
Zacorisca epacmochroma Diakonoff, 1983
Zacorisca erythromis Meyrick, 1924
Zacorisca euthalama Meyrick, 1924
Zacorisca heliaula (Meyrick, 1910)
Zacorisca helictocestum Razowski, 2013
Zacorisca helminthophora Diakonoff, 1948
Zacorisca holantha Meyrick, 1910
Zacorisca leura Razowski, 2013
Zacorisca phaeoxesta Meyrick, 1924
Zacorisca platyantha Meyrick, 1924
Zacorisca poecilantha Meyrick, 1924
Zacorisca pulchella (Schultze, 1910)
Zacorisca pyrocanthara Meyrick, 1924
Zacorisca seramica Razowski, 2013
Zacorisca sibyllina (Meyrick, 1910)
Zacorisca stephanitis (Meyrick, 1910)
Zacorisca taminia (Felder & Rogenhofer, 1875)
Zacorisca tetrachroma Diakonoff, 1944
Zacorisca thiasodes (Meyrick, 1910)
Zacorisca toxopei Diakonoff, 1948
Zacorisca vexillifera Meyrick, 1924

See also
List of Tortricidae genera

References

External links

Tortricid.net

Zacorisca
Tortricidae genera
Taxa named by Edward Meyrick